Qinghai Salt Lake Potash Company Limited is the largest potash production base in China. It owns a 120-square-kilometer salt lake in Golmud, Qinghai. The company was established and listed on the Shenzhen Stock Exchange in 1997. It specializes in the manufacture and sale of potassium chloride which are distributed under the brand name of "Yanqiao". It is owned by Qinghai Salt Lake Industry Group and Sinochem Corporation.

References

External links
Qinghai Salt Lake Potash Company Limited

Companies listed on the Shenzhen Stock Exchange
Chemical companies established in 1997
Companies based in Qinghai
Government-owned companies of China
Fertilizer companies of China